Wolfgang Benz (born 9 June 1941) is a German historian from Ellwangen. He was the director of the Center for Research on Antisemitism of the Technische Universität Berlin between 1990 and 2011.

Personal life
Benz studied history, political science and art history in Frankfurt am Main, Kiel and Munich. In 1968 he completed his doctoral thesis on under the supervision of Karl Bosl at the Ludwig-Maximilians-Universität München. From 1969 till 1990, Benz worked at the Institute for Contemporary History in Munich.
 
In 1985 he was co-founder and editor of Dachauer Hefte and since 1992 he also edits the Jahrbuch für Antisemitismusforschung (Yearbook for Research on Antisemitism). He is also editor of the Zeitschrift für Geschichtswissenschaft. (Both published by Metropol Verlag.)

In 1986 he lectured at the University of New South Wales in Sydney.

In 1992, Benz was awarded the Geschwister-Scholl-Preis and the Das politische Buch prize of the Friedrich Ebert Foundation, a social democratic political foundation.

Benz received the emeritus status on 21 October 2010.

Benz is a member of the advisory board of the Islamophobia Studies Yearbook, edited by Farid Hafez.

Research and opinions

Holocaust casualty numbers 
Benz is known for his research at the Technical University of Berlin, estimating that between 5.29–6.2 million Jews were killed by the German Nazi regime during the Holocaust. Benz has been carrying out work on data received after the opening of government archives in Eastern Europe in the 1990s resulting in the adjustment of the death tolls that had been published in the pioneering works by Raul Hilberg, Lucy Dawidowicz and Martin Gilbert. He concluded in 1999:

Comparing Islamophobia and Antisemitism 
Benz claimed in early 2010 in connection with the Minaret controversy in Switzerland that "anti-Semites of the 19th Century and some detractors of the Islam of the 21st Century work with similar methods on their concept of the enemy" and warned against the global discrimination of Muslims, which he saw as a "declaration of war against tolerance and democracy". He was criticized by historian Julius H. Schoeps who claimed Benz's suggestions are "dubious – if not dangerous" and by journalist Henryk M. Broder, pointing out that 'Islamophobia' – unlike Antisemitism – has a real basis, e.g. terrorist acts, the way dissidents are treated in Islamic countries etc. The educationist Micha Brumlik, however, has argued that as far as social-psychological aspect is concerned, Benz was right when comparing today's Islamophobia and anti-Semitism of the late 19th and early 20th century. Much like Brumlik argued also the historian Norbert Frei.

Opposition to Polish monument 
Benz opposed the idea of constructing the monument in Berlin to honor Poles who were victims of the German occupation between 1939 and 1945. Being the director of the Center for Research on Anti-Semitism, Wolfgang Benz wrote a letter to the Bundestag president warning of the "danger of nationalizing memory" by building such monuments.

Bibliography
Monographs
 Die 101 wichtigsten Fragen. Das Dritte Reich. ("The 101 Most Important Questions: The Third Reich") C. H. Beck. Munich 2006/2007.  new edition: .
 Was ist Antisemitismus? ("What is Anti-Semitism?") Bundeszentrale für politische Bildung (bpb). Bonn 2004, . (Review – German)
 Bilder vom Juden. Studien zum alltäglichen Antisemitismus. ("Images of Jews. Studies in Every-Day Anti-Semitism.") C.H. Beck, Munich 2001, (Review by Susanne Benöhr on H-Soz-Kult)
 A Concise History of the Third Reich. University of California Press, 2007. .
 Herrschaft und Gesellschaft im nationalsozialistischen Staat. Studien zur Struktur- und Mentalitätsgeschichte. (Governance and Society in the Nazi State. Studies in the History of Structure and Mentality.) Fischer, Frankfurt am Main 1990, .
 The Holocaust: A German Historian Examines the Genocide. Columbia University Press, 2000, 
 Potsdam 1945. Besatzungsherrschaft und Neuaufbau im Vier-Zonen-Deutschland. (Potsdam 1945. Occupation and Reconstruction in Four-Zone-Germany.) 4th edition, dtv, Munich 2005, .
 Ausgrenzung, Vertreibung, Völkermord. Genozid im 20. Jahrhundert. ("Marginalization, Expulsion, Genocide in the 20th Century") Deutscher Taschenbuch-Verlag, Munich 2006,  oder 
 Die Protokolle der Weisen von Zion. Die Legende von der jüdischen Weltverschwörung. ("The Protocols of the Elders of Zion. Legends about Jewish World Conspiracy"). C.H.Beck, Munich 2007,  or .Encyclopedia of German Resistance to the Nazi Movement. Continuum International Publishing Group, 1996. .

As editor
 Zwischen Antisemitismus und Philosemitismus. Juden in der Bundesrepublik. (Between Anti-Semitism and Philosemitism. Jews in the Federal Republik [of Germany].) Metropol Verlag, Berlin 1991
 Salzgitter. Geschichte und Gegenwart einer deutschen Stadt 1942 – 1992. (Salzgitter. Past and Present of a German Town, 1942–1992.) Munich 1992.
 with Angelika Königseder: Judenfeindschaft als Paradigma (Anti-Judaism as Paradigm.) Studien zur Vorurteilsforschung, Berlin 2002.
 Überleben im Dritten Reich. Juden im Untergrund und ihre Helfer. (Surviving the Third Reich. Jews in the Underground and Their Helpers.) 2003. (also known as Judenretter Review Tübingen e.V.)
 Selbstbehauptung und Opposition. Kirche als Ort des Widerstandes gegen staatliche Diktatur. (Self-Assertion and Opposition. Churches as Places of Resistance against State Dictatorship.) Berlin 2003, 
 Der Hass gegen die Juden. Dimensionen und Formen des Antisemitismus. (Hatred of Jews. Dimensions and Forms of Anti-Semitism.) Reihe Positionen, Perspektiven, Diagnosen (Band 2), Metropol Verlag, Berlin 2008,  oder 
 with Angelika Königseder: Das Konzentrationslager Dachau. Geschichte und Wirkung nationalsozialistischer Repression. (Dachau Concentration Camp. History and Effect of Nazi Repression.) Metropol Verlag, Berlin 2008, 
 Handbuch des Antisemitismus. Judenfeindschaft in Geschichte und Gegenwart. (Handbook on Anti-Semitism. Anti-Judaism in Past and Present.) de Gruyter/K. G. Saur, Berlin. 5 Bände in ca. 9 Teilbänden (geplant), bisher erschienen:
 1. Band: Länder und Regionen. (Countries and Regions.) 2008.
 2. Band: Personen. 1. A–K und 2. L–Z. (Individuals.) 2009.

As co-editor
 with Hermann Graml, Hermann Weiß: Enzyklopädie des Nationalsozialismus. (Encyclopedia on National-Socialism.). 1997 (5th edition, Klett-Cotta und Deutscher Taschenbuch-Verlag (dtv), Stuttgart and Munich 2007,  bzw. 
 with Hermann Graml: Aspekte deutscher Außenpolitik im 20. Jahrhundert. Aufsätze Hans Rothfels zum Gedächtnis. (Aspects of German Foreign Policy in the 20th Century. Essays in Remembrance of Hans Rothfels.) Deutsche Verlags-Anstalt, Stuttgart 1976.
 with Barbara Distel and Angelika Königseder (Redaktion): Der Ort des Terrors. Geschichte der nationalsozialistischen Konzentrationslager. (The Place of Terror. History of Nazi Concentration Camps.) 9 volumes, 2005–2009,  (Review); Contents)
1: Die Organisation des Terrors. (The Organization of Terror.) Co-editor Angelika Königseder. 2005. (2nd edition, 2005). 
2:  Frühe Lager. Dachau. Emslandlager. (Early Camps. Dachau, Emslandlager.) 2005 
3: Sachsenhausen, Buchenwald, mit Nebenlagern. (Sachsenhausen, Buchenwald, and Their Satellite Camps.) 
4: Flossenbürg, Mauthausen, Ravensbrück. 
5: Hinzert, Auschwitz, Neuengamme. 
6: Natzweiler, Groß-Rosen, Stutthof. 
7: Wewelsburg, Majdanek, Arbeitsdorf, Herzogenbusch (Vught), Bergen-Belsen, Mittelbau-Dora. 2008. 
8: Riga. Warschau. Kaunas. Vaivara. Plaszów. Klooga. Chelmo. Belzec. Treblinka. Sobibor. 2008. 
9: Arbeitserziehungslager, Durchgangslager, Ghettos, Polizeihaftlager, Sonderlager, Zigeunerlager, Zwangsarbeitslager. (Work Education Camps, Transit Camps, Gettos, Police Custodial Camps. Special Camps. Gypsy Camps. Forced Labor Camps.) 2009 

References

Literature
 "Wolfgang Benz." In: Kürschners Deutscher Gelehrten-Kalender 2003. 19th ed. Vol I: A – J. K. G. Saur, Munich 2003, p. 199

External links

  The Center for Research on Antisemitism
 Antisemitismus im 19. und 20. Jahrhundert von Wolfgang Benz
 Interview with Wolfgang Benz (German)

1941 births
20th-century German historians
Academic staff of the Technical University of Berlin
Ludwig Maximilian University of Munich alumni
Living people
German male non-fiction writers
Writers on antisemitism
21st-century German historians